Lucien Carré (born 1904) was a French art director  active in the French cinema designing film sets from the late 1920s to the late 1950s. He worked frequently with the director André Hunebelle as well as  Julien Duvivier and Anatole Litvak.

Selected filmography
 The Queen's Necklace (1929)
 Wine Cellars (1930)
 The Red Head (1932)
 The Last Billionaire (1934)
 Les Misérables (1934)
 With a Smile (1936)
 Hélène (1936)
 Domino (1943)
 Mr. Orchid (1946)
 Sylvie and the Ghost (1946)
 Lunegarde (1946)
 The Beautiful Trip (1947)
 The Woman in Red (1947)
 Three Boys, One Girl (1948)
 Mission in Tangier (1949)
 Millionaires for One Day (1949)
 Suzanne and the Robbers (1949)
 My Wife Is Formidable (1951)
 Dakota 308 (1951)
 My Husband Is Marvelous (1952)
 Massacre in Lace (1952)
 Cadet Rousselle (1954)
 Quay of Blondes (1954)
 Thirteen at the Table (1955)
 Mannequins of Paris (1956)
 A Certain Monsieur Jo (1958)

References

Bibliography
 Capua, Michelangelo. Anatole Litvak: The Life and Films. McFarland, 2015.
 Waldman, Harry. Maurice Tourneur: The Life and Films. McFarland, 2001.

External links

1904 births
Year of death unknown
People from Paris
French art directors